Cui Guanghao (born April 22, 1979 in Huludao, Liaoning) is a Chinese football player of Korean descent who spent the majority of his career playing for Nanjing Yoyo.

Club career
While Cui Guanghao initially started his career with the Liaoning F.C. youth team it was his time at second tier club Nanjing Yoyo where he distinguished himself as being a technically gifted player who was a regular for the team throughout their time within the second tier. On July 21, 2010 Cui and the entire first team of Nanjing Yoyo went on strike because of unpaid wages amounting up to 8 million Yuan, before a league game against Guangzhou Evergrande F.C. and this saw the club's youth players used as they were thrashed a Chinese record of 10-0. While Cui was one of the few players who returned to playing the majority of first team would not be able resolve their wage dispute with the club and the team ultimately went on a losing streak that saw them relegated. With the club in continued financial difficulties and still unable to pay their players they disbanded in 2011.

References

External links
 Player profile at Sodasoccer.com (Chinese)
 Player news at Sina.com (Chinese)
 Player profile at Sina.com (Chinese)

1979 births
Living people
People from Huludao
Chinese people of Korean descent
Chinese footballers
Footballers from Liaoning
Nanjing Yoyo players
China League One players
Association football midfielders